The U.S. House Subcommittee on the Middle East, North Africa and Central Asia is a subcommittee within the House Foreign Affairs Committee. It was previously known as the Subcommittee on the Middle East, North Africa and Global Counterterrorism, only gaining jurisdiction over Central Asia policy during the 118th Congress.

Jurisdiction
The subcommittee is one of five with what the committees calls "regional jurisdiction" over a specific area of the globe. Such jurisdiction includes political relations between the United States and countries in the region and related legislation, disaster assistance, boundary issues, and international claims. The regional subcommittees also oversee the activities of the United Nations and its programs in the region.

Members, 117th Congress

Historical membership rosters

115th Congress

116th Congress

External links
 Subcommittee page

References

Foreign Affairs Middle East, North Africa and International Terrorism